The 2017 German Masters (officially the 2017 F66.com German Masters) was a professional ranking snooker tournament that took place between 1–5 February 2017 at the Tempodrom in Berlin, Germany. It was the twelfth ranking event of the 2016/2017 season.

Martin Gould was the defending champion but he lost 2–6 against Ali Carter in the semi-finals.

Tom Ford made the 128th official maximum break and the third of his career in the second frame of his 5–2 win over Peter Ebdon in the first round. Maximum breaks had already been made in the qualifying rounds by both Ali Carter and Ross Muir.

Anthony Hamilton defeated Carter 9–6 to capture his first ranking title in his 26-year career, having trailed 2–5. At the age of 45, he also became the oldest ranking event winner since Doug Mountjoy was 46 winning the Classic in 1989. He is the third oldest winner of a ranking event after Mountjoy (46) and Ray Reardon (50 and 45).

Prize fund
The breakdown of prize money for this year is shown below:

Winner: €80,000
Runner-up: €35,000
Semi-final: €20,000
Quarter-final: €10,000
Last 16: €5,000
Last 32: €4,000
Last 64: €2,000

Highest break: €4,000
Total: €367,000

The "rolling 147 prize" for a maximum break stood at £10,000 (€13,300).

Main draw

Final

Qualifying
These matches were played between 6 and 9 December 2016 at the Barnsley Metrodome in Barnsley, England. All matches were best of 9 frames.

Ali Carter made the 125th official maximum break in the fourth frame of his round 1 qualifying match against Wang Yuchen. It was Carter's second professional maximum break. On the same day, Ross Muir made the 126th official maximum break in the third frame of his round 1 qualifying match against Itaro Santos. It was Muir's first professional maximum break.

Round 1

Round 2

Century breaks

Televised stage centuries
Total: 16

 147  Tom Ford
 137, 126  Martin Gould
 132, 104  Ryan Day
 129  Stuart Bingham
 125  Robin Hull
 118  Anthony Hamilton

 117, 112, 101, 100  Ali Carter
 117  Ben Woollaston
 115  Yan Bingtao
 103  Zhao Xintong
 100  Mark Selby

Qualifying stage centuries
Total: 56

 147, 106  Ali Carter
 147  Ross Muir
 140, 101  Stuart Carrington
 139, 123  Michael Georgiou
 138  Zhao Xintong
 136  Jamie Jones
 135, 101  Robin Hull
 135  Alfie Burden
 133, 127, 117, 106  Shaun Murphy
 132  Marco Fu
 131, 120  Mark Selby
 129  Michael White
 128  Itaro Santos
 128  Matthew Selt
 126  Scott Donaldson
 125, 110  David Gilbert
 124, 109  Tian Pengfei
 122, 112  Thepchaiya Un-Nooh
 119  Jack Lisowski
 118, 109, 102  Sunny Akani
 118  Mei Xiwen
 116  Matthew Stevens

 116  Fergal O'Brien
 114  Kyren Wilson
 113  Xiao Guodong
 113  Mark King
 112  Luca Brecel
 112  Judd Trump
 107  Joe Perry
 107  Robert Milkins
 106  Ben Woollaston
 105  Mark Allen
 105  Ronnie O'Sullivan
 105  Dominic Dale
 104  Sean O'Sullivan
 104  Joe Swail
 102  Aditya Mehta
 102  Rory McLeod
 102  Gary Wilson
 101  Ricky Walden
 101  Liam Highfield
 101  John Astley
 101  Mark Joyce

References

External links

2017
2017 in snooker
Masters
February 2017 sports events in Germany
Sports competitions in Berlin